Pseudotetracha pulchra is a species of tiger beetle in the subfamily Cicindelinae. It was described by Brown in 1869, and is endemic to Australia.

References

Beetles described in 1869
Endemic fauna of Australia
Beetles of Australia